Lists of fatal shark attacks include:

List of fatal shark attacks in Australia
List of fatal shark attacks in Réunion
List of fatal shark attacks in South African territorial waters
List of fatal shark attacks in the United States

See also
Shark attack
Shark Attack (disambiguation)